The Carbonfund.org Foundation (known as Carbonfund.org) is a 501(c)(3) not-for-profit organization based in East Aurora, New York, that provides carbon offsetting and greenhouse gas reduction options to individuals, businesses, and organizations. Carbonfund.org Foundation purchases and retires certified carbon offsets on behalf of its donors. Donors are given a choice of project type to which they may donate, including renewable energy, reforestation, and energy efficiency projects. Carbonfund.org Foundation sources carbon credits verified by the Verra carbon standard (formerly VCS) and Gold Standard. The organization has helped develop four Reducing Emissions from Deforestation and Degradation (REDD+) projects in Brazil under the VERRA and Climate, Community and Biodiversity standards.

Carbonfund.org also operates a traditional, co-ed, overnight summer camp in New Hampshire. Camp Quinebarge was founded in 1936, and was purchased by Carbonfund.org in 2012. President Eric Carlson is an alumnus of Quinebarge and now serves as Executive Director alongside Camp Director Nick Hercules. Camp Quinebarge is a traditional camp with an emphasis on nature/environmental education.

Certification
Carbonfund.org Foundation exclusively supports projects that are certified by third parties, including Environmental Resources Trust, the Climate, Community & Biodiversity Alliance, Voluntary Carbon Standard and the Chicago Climate Exchange.

Portfolio
Carbonfund.org Foundation supports three types of carbon projects: renewable energy, energy efficiency, and reforestation.

Reforestation
 Return to Forest Project
Certification: Climate, Community & Biodiversity Alliance CCBS "Gold Level"
 Tensas River Valley Reforestation Project
Verification: CCBS Gold, VCS

Renewable energy
 New Bedford Landfill Methane Project
Verification: Environmental Resources Trust
 Horse Hollow Wind Energy Center
Verification: Green-e Energy RECs
 Inland Biodigester Project
Verification: Environmental Resources Trust
 Chino Basin Dairy Farm Biodigester
Verification: Environmental Resources Trust

Energy efficiency
 IdleAire Truckstop Electrification Project
Verification: Environmental Resources Trust
 Carbon Credit Retirement
Carbonfund.org purchased carbon financial instruments from the now closed Chicago Climate Exchange and retired them.

Impact
Carbonfund.org Foundation offers offsets at $10.00 per metric ton.  As of December 2019, the foundation was offsetting over 25 million metric tons of carbon dioxide emissions.

In 2019 total revenue was $5,373,825 of which $1,578,599 was spent on carbon projects. Among the included carbon projects was the reduction of over 128,000 carbon offsets, with a total cost of $346,319. The organization's president, Eric Carlson, was paid $551,585.

Major partnerships
According to its website, Carbonfund.org Foundation has worked with over 2,000 small, medium, and large businesses since its inception, including Dell, Allstate, Orbitz, JetBlue, Budget Car Rental, LG, United States Environmental Protection Agency, Amtrak and Discovery Communications.

References

External links

Carbonfund.org blog
Five experts debate if carbon offsetting is the quick, efficient way to decarbonize the global economy, or the loophole that will derail such efforts. Interview with Eric Carlson co-founder and president in Seed (magazine) 2009.
Climate change organizations based in the United States
Non-profit organizations based in Maryland
Nature conservation organizations based in the United States